Sant’Antonio Abate is a 14th-century church and convent located in Cascia, province of Perugia, region of Umbria, Italy.

History
The convent was founded by the Benedictine order, and the church was frescoed in 14th century with frescoed by a painter (or painters) known as the Master of the Dormition, depicting the Life of St Anthony Abbot. A second series of frescoes depicting the Passion of Christ was painted in the second half of the 15th century by Nicola da Siena. The choir has a 15th-century wooden sculpture of Tobias and the Angel. On the counterfacade is an organ installed in 1630 by Luca Neri of Leonessa.

References

Churches in the province of Perugia
14th-century Roman Catholic church buildings in Italy